Christmas Eve on Sesame Street is a Sesame Street Christmas special first broadcast on PBS on Sunday, December 3, 1978.

Plot
The special starts with live-action versions of the Muppets enjoying an ice skating party. Afterward, they head home to Sesame Street performing the song "True Blue Miracle".

In the main story, Oscar the Grouch plants the seeds of doubt in Big Bird's mind whether Santa Claus can actually get down chimneys to deliver Christmas presents. Big Bird enlists the help of Kermit and Grover to interview children about how he manages it; their responses vary. Big Bird even attempts a reenactment with Snuffy but it is unsuccessful.  He spends the night out in the cold on the brownstone's roof, waiting for Santa to appear in person.  After the residents of Sesame Street realize that Big Bird has gone missing, Maria confronts Oscar for upsetting Big Bird. Oscar reveals that he was only teasing Big Bird and agrees to help search for him.

Meanwhile, in a variation on the 1905 O. Henry story "The Gift of the Magi", Bert and Ernie want to give each other Christmas presents, but they have no money. Bert trades away his prized paper clip collection to buy a pink soap dish for Ernie's Rubber Duckie, but Ernie has bartered it to get Bert an empty cigar box for his paper clip collection. Mr. Hooper, the store owner, realizes what is happening and gives them their treasured possessions back as Christmas presents.

Also, Cookie Monster attempts to get in touch with Santa Claus to bring him cookies for Christmas. In confusion he ends up violently eating a pencil and typewriter to write a letter, and a telephone to call the North Pole.  At Gordon and Susan Robinson's apartment, he laments to Gordon that he was unable to contact Santa. Gordon suggests leaving cookies for Santa, leaving him perplexed.

In the end, Big Bird walks down from the roof to warm up, much to the relief of his friends. He realizes Santa had already come and gone when he sees the presents under the tree (due to him falling asleep on the roof and Santa's shadow looms over him while he's asleep). He regrets not learning how Santa can go down chimneys, but he comes to recognize that being together with family and friends is more important. Oscar, true to form, starts needling him about how the Easter Bunny can hide all the eggs in one night, only to be rebuked by Gordon and Susan as Big Bird begins to fret about the holidays all over again.

The special concludes with Susan and Gordon returning to their apartment to find that Cookie Monster has eaten the needles and decorations off their Christmas tree.

Cast

Puppeteers
 Caroll Spinney as Big Bird and Oscar the Grouch
 Jim Henson as Kermit the Frog and Ernie
 Frank Oz as Grover, Bert, and Cookie Monster
 Jerry Nelson as The Count and Snuffy
 Richard Hunt as Oscar the Grouch (assistant), Cookie Monster (assistant), Ernie (assistant) and Snuffy (assistant)

The cast of Sesame Street
 Linda Bove as Linda
 Northern Calloway as David
 Debbie Chen as Patty
 Will Lee as Mr. Hooper
 Loretta Long as Susan Robinson
 Sonia Manzano as Maria
 Bob McGrath as Bob Johnson
 Roscoe Orman as Gordon Robinson
 Alaina Reed as Olivia Robinson
 Danny Epstein as the Street Musician
 Chet O'Brien as Mr. Macintosh
 Jon Stone as the Voice of Santa Claus over Cookie Monster's telephone

Credits
 Producer: Dulcy Singer
 Written by Jon Stone and Joseph A. Bailey
 Skaters from Holiday on Ice
 "True Blue Miracle" by Carol Hall
 "Keep Christmas With You" and "I Hate Christmas" by Sam Pottle and David Axelrod
 Original Music Arranger and Conductor: Dick Lieb
 Music Coordinator: Danny Epstein
 Music Assistant: Dave Connor
 Associate Director: Ozzie Alfonso
 Production Supervisor: Robert Braithwaite
 Muppets by: Donald Sahlin, Kermit Love, Caroly Wilcox, John Lovelady
 Art Director: Alan J. Compton
 Production Stage Manager: Chet O'Brien
 Stage Manager: Emily Squires
 Set Decorator: Nat Mongioi
 Lighting Directors: David M. Clark, Tony DiGirolamo
 Graphic Artist: Gerri Brioso
 Costume Designer: Bill Kellard
 Wardrobe: Grisha Mynova
 Production Assistants: Mercedes Polanco, Sharen Gay, Cathi Rosenberg
 Technical Advisor: Walt Rauffer
 Technical Director: Ralph Mensch
 Sound Effects: Dick Maitland, Roy Carch
 Audio: Mike Shoskes, Jay Judell
 Executive Producer: Jon Stone
 Production Conceived and Directed by: Jon Stone

Songs
A variety of Christmas songs help interweave these three plot lines and make the production much more touching, including:

"Feliz Navidad", by José Feliciano while Big Bird skates with one of the children (preceded and followed by a slow orchestral version of the song).
"True Blue Miracle", sung during the gang's trip from the ice rink back to Sesame Street.
"Keep Christmas with You (All Through the Year)", sung in Bob's apartment with Linda leading a group of children in signing the chorus.
"I Hate Christmas", sung by Oscar the Grouch outside on Sesame Street.
"Have Yourself a Merry Little Christmas", sung by Bert and Ernie after opening their Christmas presents to each other.
"Keep Christmas with You (All Through the Year)" (Reprise), sung by everyone at the end.

Awards
1979: Emmy Award for Outstanding Children's Program - Jon Stone (executive producer), Dulcy Singer (producer)

One of the special's competitors that year was a lesser-known, critically panned Sesame Street special on CBS -- A Special Sesame Street Christmas.

In 1988, the production was converted to a live show and performed on ice for a single show in Philadelphia, PA. In the audience that day was none other than the Mankus family.

Edits
In various re-airings on PBS in the late 1980s and on the version on HBO Max, the closing scene with Susan and Gordon finding that Cookie Monster ate the needles and discovered off their Christmas tree was cut, likely due to a combination of the PBS closing credits at the end of the original and for Cookie Monster's excessive belching.

On video releases since the mid-1990s, the 1978 Children's Television Workshop logo with Christmas music was cut. The 1996 VHS replaces it with the 1983 logo, and DVD releases of the special start without any logos.

In December 2020, the special was released on the HBO Max streaming service. Jose Feliciano’s recording of Feliz Navidad was removed, presumably due to copyright issues, while the instrumental version played beforehand remains.

When Big Bird and Patty check on Oscar following his skating accident, his original line was "Sure. I've been thrown out of better places than that." It was later re-dubbed in post-production (to "Let's go back and do it, again!"), because Jon Stone considered the original joke too adult-focused.

Home media
The special was released on VHS in 1987 and 1996, and on DVD in 2002 and 2008.

Recording
The soundtrack album features several of the songs from the special, along with narration. It was nominated for a Grammy Award, but lost to In Harmony: A Sesame Street Record.

See also
 List of American films of 1978
 List of Christmas television specials
 List of Christmas films

References

External links

1978 television specials
Christmas television specials
Sesame Street features
Emmy Award-winning programs
1970s American television specials
Adaptations of works by O. Henry
Santa Claus in television
Easter Bunny in television
1978 films
Films directed by Jon Stone
1970s American films
Films set in New York City